In category theory, a branch of mathematics, a dagger category (also called involutive category or category with involution) is a category equipped with a certain structure called dagger or involution.  The name dagger category was coined by Peter Selinger.

Formal definition 

A dagger category is a category  equipped with an involutive contravariant endofunctor  which is the identity on objects.

In detail, this means that:
 for all morphisms , there exist its adjoint 
 for all morphisms , 
 for all objects , 

Note that in the previous definition, the term "adjoint" is used in a way analogous to (and inspired by) the linear-algebraic sense, not in the category-theoretic sense.

Examples 

In this example, a self-adjoint morphism is a symmetric relation.
 The category Cob of cobordisms is a dagger compact category, in particular it possesses a dagger structure.
 The category Hilb of Hilbert spaces also possesses a dagger structure: Given a bounded linear map , the map  is just its adjoint in the usual sense.
 Any monoid with involution is a dagger category with only one object. In fact, every endomorphism hom-set in a dagger category is not simply a monoid, but a monoid with involution, because of the dagger.
 A discrete category is trivially a dagger category.
 A groupoid (and as trivial corollary, a group) also has a dagger structure with the adjoint of a morphism being its inverse. In this case, all morphisms are unitary (definition below).

Remarkable morphisms 

In a dagger category , a morphism  is called
 unitary if 
 self-adjoint if  
The latter is only possible for an endomorphism . The terms unitary and self-adjoint in the previous definition are taken from the category of Hilbert spaces, where the morphisms satisfying those properties are then unitary and self-adjoint in the usual sense.

See also 

 *-algebra
 Dagger symmetric monoidal category
 Dagger compact category

References